The Little Rascals is a 1994 American family comedy film produced by Amblin Entertainment, and released by Universal Pictures on August 5, 1994. The film is an adaptation of Hal Roach's Our Gang, a series of short films of the 1920s, 1930s, and 1940s (many of which were broadcast on television as The Little Rascals) which centered on the adventures of a group of neighborhood children. Directed by  Penelope Spheeris, who co-wrote the screenplay with Paul Guay and Stephen Mazur, the film presents several of the Our Gang characters in an updated setting, featuring re-interpretations of several of the original shorts. It is the first collaboration by Guay and Mazur, whose subsequent comedies were Liar Liar and Heartbreakers.

Another film based on Our Gang, The Little Rascals Save the Day, was released as a direct-to-video feature in 2014.

Plot
Spanky is the president of the "He-Man Woman ('woman' is misspelled as 'womun') Haters Club" with many school-aged boys from around the neighborhood as members. His best friend, Alfalfa, has been chosen as the driver for the club's prize-winning undefeated go-kart, "The Blur", in the annual Soap Box Derby style race. However, when the announcement is made, Alfalfa is nowhere to be found.

The boys catch Alfalfa in the company of Darla. The club's members try their hardest to break the two apart, eventually causing their beloved clubhouse to burn down. Darla is mistakenly led to believe Alfalfa feels ashamed of her, so she turns her attentions to Waldo, the new rich kid whose father is an oil tycoon. Spanky, Stymie and friends judge Alfalfa's punishment to be left guarding the go-kart day and night until the day of the race. Until that day comes, Alfalfa makes many attempts to woo back Darla including a visit to her ballet rehearsal, an undelivered love letter, and through serenade, all of which fail.

In order to rebuild their clubhouse, the boys try to fund-raise the cost of lumber, $450, but the youngest ones, Porky and Buckwheat, have unknowingly come up with $500. Their school teacher finds out about the scheme, but Spanky convinces her to use the funds as prize money for the go-kart derby.

"The Blur" is stolen by local bullies Butch and Woim. In addition to having to rebuild the clubhouse, the boys now need a new set of wheels. They band together to build "The Blur 2: The Sequel." Prior to race day, Spanky and Alfalfa reconcile and decide to ride in the two-seat go-kart together. They hope to win the prize money and the trophy, to be presented to the victors by the greatest racer of all, "A.J. Ferguson."

Butch and Woim make several sneaky attempts to stop Alfalfa and Spanky from winning the race. Waldo, who (seemingly) kicks out Darla from his race car, pulls a few tricks of his own. It's a wild race to the finish, but "The Blur 2" crosses the finish line ahead of the pack (and resulting in a photo-finish between "The Blur" and "The Blur 2" literally "by a hair" due to Alfalfa's pointy hairstyle), despite the many scrapes and crashes throughout the derby. When Butch and Woim try to beat up Alfalfa, he knocks Butch into pig slop and Woim throws himself in.

Along with first prize, Alfalfa also wins back Darla's heart after it turns out that Darla kicked Waldo out of the car, not the other way around. Spanky, meanwhile, is shocked at the trophy presentation when he finally meets his favorite driver, A.J. Ferguson -- "a girl!" As soon as the club house is rebuilt, the boys collectively have a change of heart toward membership and welcome Darla and friends to their club, with "Women Welcome" added to the sign.

At the end of the movie, it is revealed that Uh-Huh can say more than simply “Uh-Huh.” The movie closes with bloopers from the kids while filming.

Cast

 Travis Tedford as "Spanky" McFarland, the president of "He-Man Women Hater's Club" and Alfalfa's best friend
 Bug Hall as "Alfalfa" Switzer, Spanky's best friend and Darla's boyfriend
 Brittany Ashton Holmes as Darla, Alfalfa's girlfriend
 Kevin Jamal Woods as "Stymie", the club's vice-president
 Jordan Warkol (voice dubbed by E. G. Daily) as "Froggy", a club member with a croaking voice and a love for amphibians
 Zachary Mabry as "Porky", one of the younger members of the club and Buckwheat's best friend
 Ross Bagley as "Buckwheat", another one of the younger members of the club and Porky's best friend
 Sam Saletta as "Butch", the neighborhood bully
 Blake Jeremy Collins as "Woim", Butch's friend and sidekick
 Blake McIver Ewing as Waldo Johnston III, an obnoxious rich new kid who is very interested in Darla
 Courtland Mead as "Uh-huh" – club "typographer", always answers "uh-huh"
 Juliette Brewer as Mary Ann
 Heather Karasek as Jane
 Raven-Symoné as Stymie's girlfriend at the club
 Mary-Kate and Ashley Olsen as the twin girls at Darla's sleepover
 Mel Brooks as Mr. Welling, the stingy bank teller
 Lea Thompson as Miss Roberts, Darla's ballet instructor
 Daryl Hannah as Miss Crabtree, the gang's schoolteacher
 Reba McEntire as A.J. Ferguson, "the best driver there is"
 Whoopi Goldberg as Buckwheat's mother
 Donald Trump as Waldo Johnston II, Waldo's father
 Eric Edwards as Spanky's father
 Dan Carton as Alfalfa's father
 George Wendt as Lumber store guy
 Alexandra Monroe King and Zoe Oakes as Darla's friends at Darla's sleepover
 Katie Volding as Uh-huh's girlfriend at the club (uncredited)

Animals
 Petey, an American Bulldog
 Fifi, a Doberman Pinscher
 Elmer, a white-throated white Capuchin monkey and part of the Rascal's club.

Production
Bill Thomas Jr., son of the late Bill Thomas, who played the original Buckwheat, contacted the studio and was invited down to visit the set, but got the impression that the filmmakers did not want him or any of the surviving original cast members involved in any production capacity. The surviving cast members saw this as especially hurtful, in light of the fact that director Penelope Spheeris had previously made a point of including Buddy Ebsen, from the original Beverly Hillbillies, in her 1993 feature film adaptation of that series. Eugene Jackson, who played the original Pineapple from the silent Our Gang comedies, tried unsuccessfully to contact the studio to be a part of production, stated, "It's real cold. They have no respect for the old-timers. At least they could have recognized some of the living legends surviving from the first films." Filming took place from January 11, 1994 to April 6, 1994.

Release

Critical response
On Rotten Tomatoes the film has an approval rating of 21% based on reviews from 14 critics as of December 2022. On Metacritic it has a score of 45 out of 100 based on reviews from 20 critics, indicating "mixed or average reviews". Audiences surveyed by CinemaScore gave the film a grade "A−" on scale of A to F.

Brian Lowry of Variety magazine wrote: "Those who grew up watching The Little Rascals may well be intrigued by the idea of introducing their kids to this full-color, bigscreen version. Still, the challenge of stretching those mildly diverting shorts to feature length remains formidable, and one has to wonder whether an audience exists beyond nostalgic parents and their young children."

Box office
The Little Rascals earned $10 million at the North American box office during its opening weekend. The film grossed a worldwide total of $67,308,282.

Repurposed scenes and situations

Many of the gags and subplots in the film were borrowed from the original Our Gang/Little Rascals shorts. These include:
 The scene in which Buckwheat and Porky are fishing and get their fishing lines tangled originates from a scene in the 1943 Our Gang short Three Smart Guys with Buckwheat, Froggy, and Mickey.
 The He-Man Woman Haters Club originally appeared in the 1937 Our Gang short Hearts are Thumps; the club would return in the short Mail and Female the same year. The plots for both shorts were reused for the film. In addition, the scene where the gang ruins Alfalfa and Darla's lunch date, as well as the scene where bubbles come out of Alfalfa's mouth while he sings, were borrowed gags from Hearts are Thumps. Alfalfa sending Buckwheat and Porky to deliver a love note to Darla was borrowed from Mail and Female.
 The "hi-sign" originally appeared in the 1935 Our Gang short Anniversary Trouble, and the animated 1979 special The Little Rascals Christmas Special.
 Alfalfa faking a toothache comes from the Academy Award-winning Our Gang short Bored of Education (1936).
 The children dressing up as fire fighters and attempting to put out a fire appeared in the Our Gang shorts Fire Fighters (1922), The Fourth Alarm (1926), and Hook and Ladder (1932). The gag in which Spanky (Travis Tedford) winds up on a flying water hose was originally used with Farina in The Fourth Alarm.
 The gag involving Spanky and Stymie disguising as adults appeared in a handful of Our Gang shorts. Mickey Daniels and Johnny Downs attempted to dress up as Santa Claus with this gag in the 1926 short Good Cheer. Farina and Pleurisy tried this routine in the 1929 short Election Day. Stymie and Dickie Moore tried it in the 1933 short Fish Hooky, while Spanky and Alfalfa tried pulling it off in both the 1935 short Teacher's Beau and the 1936 short Two Too Young.
 The scene in which Spanky and Alfalfa accidentally find themselves performing in a ballet recital was inspired by the plot of the 1937 short Rushin' Ballet. The costumes that the duo wear are exact replicas of the costumes that the original Spanky and Alfalfa wore in Rushin' Ballet. The gag in which Alfalfa gets a frog loose in his clothes was originally used in the 1937 short Framing Youth, where Spanky was trying to convince him he had a frog in his throat.
 Alfalfa singing "The Barber of Seville" originated in Our Gang Follies of 1938.
 The idea of the children building their own vehicle out of junk and scrap metal had been used in several Our Gang shorts, most notably the 1934 short Hi'-Neighbor!. The gag in which the kids' car causes several adults to leap into the air was also borrowed from Hi'-Neighbor!, and also appears in One Wild Ride (1925), Free Wheeling (1932), and Divot Diggers (1936).
 Much of the Go-Cart race climax (including the gag in which the car belonging to Butch and Woim accidentally goes into reverse) was borrowed from the 1939 short Auto Antics. Material from Hi'-Neighbor and Three Men in a Tub (1938) is also present.

Home media
The Little Rascals was released on VHS, DVD, and Blu-ray in 1995, 2004, and 2014 respectively.

See also
 Our Gang
 The Little Rascals (animated TV series)
 The Little Rascals Save the Day (2014 film)

References

External links

 
 
 
 

1994 films
1990s children's comedy films
1994 comedy films
1990s buddy comedy films
Amblin Entertainment films
American children's comedy films
Films about children
Films about sexism
Films directed by Penelope Spheeris
Films scored by William Ross
Our Gang
Universal Pictures films
1990s English-language films
1990s American films